Salton Sea Beach is a census-designated place (CDP) in Imperial County, California, located  southeast of Desert Shores. The population was 508 at the 2020 census, up from 422 at the 2010 census, up from 392 at the 2000 census. It is part of the El Centro, California Metropolitan Statistical Area. It was the location of the Naval Auxiliary Air Station Salton Sea.

Geography
Salton Sea Beach is located along the western shore of the Salton Sea, to the north of Salton City and to the south of Desert Shores along California State Route 86. The Salton Sea has an extremely high salt content and is surrounded by salt flats which can easily be broken using one's hand.

Demographics

2010
The 2010 United States Census reported that Salton Sea Beach had a population of 422. The racial makeup of Salton Sea Beach was 309 (73.2%) White, 6 (1.4%) African American, 4 (0.9%) Native American, 2 (0.5%) Asian, 2 (0.5%) Pacific Islander, 82 (19.4%) from other races, and 17 (4.0%) from two or more races. Hispanic or Latino of any race were 229 persons (54.3%).

The census reported that 422 people (100% of the population) lived in households and none were institutionalized or in non-institutionalized group quarters.

There were 177 households, of which 44 (24.9%) had children under the age of 18 living in them, 67 (37.9%) were opposite-sex married couples living together, 14 (7.9%) had a female householder with no husband present, 13 (7.3%) had a male householder with no wife present. There were 8 (4.5%) unmarried opposite-sex partnerships and 3 (1.7%) same-sex married couples or partnerships. 74 households (41.8%) were made up of individuals, and 46 (26.0%) had someone living alone who was 65 years of age or older. The average household size was 2.38. There were 94 families (53.1% of all households); the average family size was 3.36.

109 people (25.8%) were under the age of 18, 41 (9.7%) aged 18 to 24, 71 (16.8%) aged 25 to 44, 93 (22.0%) aged 45 to 64 and 108 (25.6%) were 65 years of age or older. The median age was 40.0. For every 100 females, there were 128.1 males. For every 100 females age 18 and over, there were 118.9 males.

The homeowner vacancy rate was 3.4%; the rental vacancy rate was 12.9%. 304 people (72.0% of the population) lived in owner-occupied housing units and 118 people (28.0%) lived in rental housing units.

2000
At the 2000 census, there were 392 people, 200 households and 111 families residing in the CDP. The racial makeup of the CDP was 73.2% White, 2.0% African American, 3.3% Native American, 0.5% Asian, 17.9% from other races, and 3.1% from two or more races. Hispanic or Latino of any race were 22.5% of the population.

There were 200 households, of which 14.0% had children under the age of 18 living with them, 44.0% were married couples living together, 7.0% had a female householder with no husband present, and 44.5% were non-families. 41.5% of all households were made up of individuals, and 28.0% had someone living alone who was 65 years of age or older. The average household size was 2.0 and the average family size was 2.6.

16.8% of the population were under the age of 18, 4.3% from 18 to 24, 14.5% from 25 to 44, 24.2% from 45 to 64, and 40.1% who were 65 years of age or older. The median age was 60 years. For every 100 females, there were 94.1 males. For every 100 females age 18 and over, there were 92.9 males.

The median household income was $13,664 and the median family income was $14,457. Males had a median income of $33,750 and females $17,031. The per capita income was $17,252. About 31.2% of families and 33.4% of the population were below the poverty line, including 58.3% of those under age 18 and 4.6% of those age 65 or over.

Government

Water service is provided by the Coachella Valley Water District.

See also
San Diego–Imperial, California
El Centro Metropolitan Area

References

External links

Salton Sea Beach, California — at City-Data.
USA.com: Salton Sea Beach, CA 

Census-designated places in Imperial County, California
Salton Sea
El Centro metropolitan area
Imperial Valley
Populated places in the Colorado Desert
Census-designated places in California